Hans Kristoffer Mosesson (born 1 August 1944) is a Swedish actor and musician.

Hans Mosesson was born in the Enskede district of Stockholm. He studied medicine at the University of Lund in the 1970s. In Lund, he met the newly founded leftist theater and musical group Nationalteatern, and Mosesson quit his studies and joined the group and moved with them to Gothenburg. He both wrote and sang the songs "Plast's sång" and "Lägg av!", among others.

Mosesson has also been in many Swedish films and TV-productions. In recent years, he has become a household face in Sweden after starring in a long-running series of commercials for grocery chain ICA.

Filmography 

 Första Kärleken (1992)
 A Life for the Taking (1995)
 Andra Avenyn (2010)
 Den Onda Ringen (2013)
 Jordskott (2015)

External links 

Swedish male musicians
Swedish male television actors
Swedish male film actors
1944 births
Living people